The 1964 Austrian Grand Prix was a Formula One World Championship motor race held at Zeltweg Airfield on August 23, 1964. It was race 7 of 10 in both the 1964 World Championship of Drivers and the 1964 International Cup for Formula One Manufacturers. The 105-lap race was won by Ferrari driver Lorenzo Bandini after he started from seventh position. Richie Ginther finished second for the BRM team and Brabham driver Bob Anderson came in third. This was the debut World Championship race of the future world champion Jochen Rindt.

Classification

Qualifying

Race

Championship standings after the race 

Drivers' Championship standings

Constructors' Championship standings

 Notes: Only the top five positions are included for both sets of standings. Only best 6 results counted toward the championship. Numbers without parentheses are championship points, numbers in parentheses are total points scored.

References

External links 
 1964 Austrian Grand Prix at statsf1.com
 1964 Austrian Grand Prix at grandprix.com

Austrian Grand Prix
Grand Prix
Austrian Grand Prix